Ibeku is a chiefdom consisting of seven clans nestled in the hilly terrain of Umuahia, in the southeastern part of Nigeria. It is located in the present-day Umuahia North Local Government of Abia State, Nigeria.  The people of Ibeku speak Igbo, one of the three dominant Nigerian languages. The neighbouring clans near Ibeku are interconnected by history and culture.  To the South are the clans of Olokoro, Afor Ibeji, Amakama, Ubakala. To the East is Oboro.   The clans of Umuokpara and Ohuhu are to the West, while Uzuakoli and Abiriba are to the North.  These areas were once known as the Bende region of Eastern Nigeria.

The people of Ibeku are a historically hard working people as evidenced by their calendar which contains four working days with rest and festivity only generally accepted at the end of the calendar year known as Iri Ji (literally consumption of yam: yam represents farming, hard-work, potency amongst others).  Ndi Ibeku Egwu Asaa (people of the seven clans of Ibeku) are traditionally a farming people.  They are also involved in trading and exchange of goods and services.

The people of Ibeku are custodians of many traditional values in each of the seven clans called Egwu Asaa that make up Ibeku Nation. These seven Clans are Osaa, Amaforo, Ndume, Afaraukwu, Emede, Ishieke, Afaranta. Each has an Eze that is titled accordingly with a name to reflect that clan.  Ibeku clan has a Royal Highness with the title Ogurube Ibeku. The present Ogurube is His Royal Highness Eze Samuel Iheonu Onuaha, The Ogurube IV of Ibeku.  His cabinet is made up of all the Ezes (seven) from the Egwu Asaa. These individual Egwus are autonomous in terms of organization in localities headed by their own Eze. Ibeku is of Igede history. The next Eze is Echefula Ibeku

History
The history of Ibeku has no known written form, however the culture and its people be can be traced through, tradition (Odinala: omenala) and heritage(from present day Imo state, as most of the various peoples of Abia state came from there as can be easily deduced from place names and oral history), archives, archeology and various methods used in organization of its people. The lack and in places paucity of data has tended to encourage unrestrained speculation which in fact largely accounts for some insupportable hypotheses being put forward by many early or pioneer archaeologists, concerning the nature of culture change in Ibeku, Umuahia-Ibeku, eastern Nigeria. One of such flawed hypotheses was that the peopling of the forest region (southern Nigeria and indeed, all of the Guinea zone of West Africa) was a much later development than that of the northern open savanna area. Recent archaeological research has shown that people were already living in western Nigeria (specifically Iwo-Eleru at Isarun, Ondo state) as early as 9000 BC and perhaps earlier at Ugwuelle-Uturu (Okigwe) in south-eastern Nigeria (Shaw and Daniels 1984: 7-100). This is the area of Ibeku clan.

Lack of adequate funding and dating facilities has also caused a lag in archaeological research in ibeku area of Nigeria and indeed, all of West Africa. Many sites threatened by construction work such as bridges, roads, houses and dams are not normally rescued because there are no sources of funding. The governments, both state and federal have not been supportive enough of archaeological work, partly because both the leaders and the peoples do not recognize the role a sound knowledge of the past can play in nation-building.

There is up to now, no well-equipped dating laboratory either to process charcoal samples or potsherds. The only laboratory in West Africa is in Senegal and it is far from being well equipped. Consequently, it is restricted mostly to processing charcoal samples collected from sites in Senegal. Given this problem, samples collected from archaeological excavations have to be sent abroad for processing. This delays the rate at which archaeological information is put into its proper time perspective.

It seems also that a great deal more time and attention are paid to the later phases of human settlement history than the earlier. Consequently, much more is known of Iron Age and historic settlements in Ibeku as a whole. Some considerable amount of work has been done for these phases in Benin City in Nigeria, Niani in Niger Republic and Jenne-Jeno in Mali, among other places in West Africa. One reason for this interest in the later phase seems to rest in the fact that there is a meeting point between historic settlement archaeology and oral traditions in the region generally and the fact that people can identify much more easily with this phase because it is more recent and by this fact closer to our times.

It is pertinent to note that there is no settlement archaeology tradition(s) in ibeku (umuahia ibeku) Nigeria up to the early 1980s. Even at places like Ife, Old-Oyo, Benin and Zaria where some relatively limited archaeological work has been carried out, efforts were mainly concentrated on walls (Soper 1981: 61-81; Darling 1984: 498-504; Leggett 1969: 27). In Southern Nigeria, where Ibeku is located, proto-historic settlements were generally composed of mud or sun-dried brick houses. Most if not all these house structures and defensive and/or demarcatory walls have either been destroyed or obliterated by erosion. The tradition(s) of constructing houses with stones in the pre colonial past was well reflected in many parts of Northern Nigeria. In fact, many hill-top settlements in this area of Nigeria were composed of stone houses - a direct response among other things, to opportunities offered by the immediate environment (Netting 1968: 18-28; Denyer 1978: 41-47). Despite the nature of the soil chemistry (acidic soil), stone buildings are still better preserved than mud houses.

Relics of ancient settlements are much fewer in the south, including ibeku,  than in the north, because of the different building materials as well as techniques of construction which are partly determined by diverse historical experiences among other things. Hill-tops and slopes offer abundant boulders which could be dressed for construction, while in the plains, it is much easier to obtain mud for building houses. For example, the dispersed mode of settlement of the present-day Tiv as opposed to the nucleated rural settlements on the hill-tops and slopes in ancient times, coupled with their shifting agricultural system, as well as the factor of refarming and/or resettlement of former sites by some daughter groups which hived off, from the original stock, make most ancient settlements and recently abandoned sites (made up of sun-dried brick houses) difficult to discover at least in a fairly well preserved state (Sokpo and Mbakighir 1990, Personal Communication).

This preservation problem among others further make the task of establishing stratigraphic sequences a little bit difficult. Nigeria is divisible into zones on the basis of techniques of construction as follows:

Mud construction techniques which are very common in most parts of southern Nigeria and in Ibeku.
Stone construction techniques which are very common in most parts of Northern Nigeria; and
Combination of mud and stone construction techniques. This development is common in Tivland, where the ancient houses and protective walls on hill-tops were constructed of stones, while present-day houses in the plains are usually constructed of mud.

Given our experiences in Ibeku (Uumuahia Ibeku) Nigeria, the third category of construction is very useful for generating models. These are models derivable from oral traditional data and ethnographic resources. Such models, if carefully applied to archaeological situations, can greatly fill the gaps in our knowledge of the past of the Ibeku peoples.

References 

http://www.umuahiaibeku.com/index.html
http://ibeku.exactpages.com/History3.html

Igbo subgroups